This list of the prehistoric life of Idaho contains the various prehistoric life-forms whose fossilized remains have been reported from within the US state of Idaho.

Precambrian
The Paleobiology Database records no known occurrences of Precambrian fossils in Alabama.

Paleozoic

Selected Paleozoic taxa of Idaho

 †Acrothyra
 †Adrianites
  †Agnostus
 †Amplexus
 † Ananias
 Archaeolithophyllum
 †Atrypa
 †Aulopora
 †Aviculopecten
 †Aviculopecten kaibabensis – or unidentified comparable form
 † Avonia
 †Bathyuriscus
 †Benthamaspis
 †Caninia
 †Cardiograptus
 †Chancia
 †Chonetes
 †Chonetes logani
 †Cleiothyridina
 †Cleiothyridina sublamellosa
  †Climacograptus
 †Climacograptus bicornis
 †Climacograptus innotatus
 †Climacograptus scalaris – or unidentified comparable form
  †Composita
 †Composita humilis
 †Composita idahoensis – type locality for species
 †Composita mira – or unidentified comparable form
 †Composita sigma
 †Composita subquadrata
 †Composita subtilita – or unidentified comparable form
 †Composita sulcata
 †Cyrtograptus
 †Cystodictya
 †Dictyonema
 †Didymograptus
 †Didymograptus extensus
 †Diplograptus
 †Edmondia
 †Ehmaniella
  †Elrathia
 †Elrathina
 †Euomphalus
 †Fenestella
 †Gastrioceras – report made of unidentified related form or using admittedly obsolete nomenclature
 †Girvanella
 †Gogia
 †Goniograptus
 †Haplophrentis
 †Helcionella
  †Helicoprion
 †Helicoprion davisii – type locality for species
 †Hintzeia
 †Hyolithes
 †Isograptus
 †Kazakhstania
 †Kootenia
 †Lingula
 †Lingulella
 †Lithostrotion
  †Margaretia
 †Martinia
 †Micromitra
  †Monograptus
 †Monograptus convolutus
 †Morania
 †Naticopsis
 †Neospirifer
 †Niobe – tentative report
 †Obolus
 †Ogygopsis
  †Olenoides
 †Orthotheca
 †Oryctocephalus
 †Pagetia
 Palaeoaplysina
 †Paterina
 †Pelagiella
 †Peronopsis
 †Phyllograptus
 †Plaesiomys
 †Platyceras
 †Platycrinites
  †Platystrophia
 †Poulsenia
 †Prodentalium
  †Proetus
 †Protopliomerella
 †Protospongia
 †Quadratia
 †Selkirkia
 †Siphonodendron
 †Spirifer
 †Spirifer brazerianus
 †Spiriferina
 †Strophomena
  †Syringopora
 †Tetragraptus
 †Tetrataxis
 †Thoracocare
 †Urotheca
 †Wilkingia
 †Worthenia – tentative report
 †Zacanthoides

Mesozoic

Selected Mesozoic taxa of Idaho

 †Albanites
 †Anaflemingites
 †Anasibirites
 †Anemia
  †Arcestes – tentative report
 †Arctomeekoceras
 †Aspenites
Astarte
 †Aviculopecten – report made of unidentified related form or using admittedly obsolete nomenclature
 †Aviculopecten altus – type locality for species
 †Aviculopecten idahoensis
 †Aviculopecten pealei – type locality for species
 †Carteria – type locality for genus
 †Ceccaisculitoides
 †Ceccaisculitoides hammondi
 Chlamys
 †Claraia
 †Claraia stachei
 Corbicula
 †Cryptaulax
  †Cycadeoidea
  †Cymbospondylus
 †Dagnoceras
 †Dennstaedtia – tentative report
 †Enoploceras
 †Flemingites
 †Germanonautilus
 †Gervillia – report made of unidentified related form or using admittedly obsolete nomenclature
 Gleichenia
 †Gryphaea
 †Grypoceras
 †Hedenstroemia
  †Inoceramus
 †Inyoites
 †Inyoites oweni
 †Lecanites
 †Lingula
 Lopha
 †Meekoceras
 †Meekoceras gracilitatis – type locality for species
 †Megasphaeroceras
 †Naticopsis – tentative report
 †Nemacanthus
 †Nemacanthus elegans – type locality for species
 †Neogondolella
 †Neospathodus
 †Nerinea
  †Normannites
 †Orthoceras
 Ostrea
 †Owenites
 †Owenites koeneni – or unidentified comparable form
 †Pagiophyllum
 †Palaeophyllites – tentative report
 †Phaedrysmocheilus
  Pholadomya
 †Pholadomya inaequiplicata
 †Plagiostoma
 †Platymya
  †Pleuronautilus
 †Protocardia
 †Pseudomelania – tentative report
 †Pteria – tentative report
 †Rhaetina
 †Rhynchonella – report made of unidentified related form or using admittedly obsolete nomenclature
 †Saurichthys
 †Spiriferina
 †Spiriferina roundyi
 †Stephanoceras
  †Tempskya
  †Tenontosaurus
 †Thamnasteria
 †Trigonia
 †Trigonia montanaensis
 †Ussuria
 †Ussurites
 †Vex – type locality for genus
 †Worthenia
 †Wyomingites – type locality for genus
 †Xenoceltites
 †Xenoceltites cordilleranus
  †Xenodiscus

Cenozoic

Selected Cenozoic taxa of Idaho

  Abies
 Acer
 †Acritohippus
 †Acritohippus isonesus
  †Aepycamelus
 †Aesculus
 Agelaius
 †Agelaius phoeniceus
 †Agriotherium
 †Alforjas – tentative report
 Alnus
  †Amebelodon
 Amelanchier
 Anas
 †Anas platyrhynchos
 Anser
 †Anser caerulescens
 Antilocapra
 †Antilocapra americana
 Antrozous
 †Antrozous pallidus
 †Aphelops
 †Archaeohippus
  †Arctodus
 †Arctodus simus
 Ardea
 †Ardea herodias
 Baiomys
 Betula
 Bibio
 Bison
 †Bison antiquus – or unidentified comparable form
  †Bison latifrons
 †Bison priscus
 Boletina
 †Bolitophila
 †Bombus
 Bonasa
 †Bonasa umbellus
 †Bootherium
 †Bootherium bombifrons
 †Borophagus
 †Borophagus diversidens
 †Borophagus hilli
 †Borophagus pugnator
  †Brachycrus
 Brachylagus
 †Brachylagus idahoensis
 Branta
 †Branta canadensis
 Bucephala
  †Camelops
 †Camelops hesternus
 Camponotus
 Canis
  †Canis dirus
 †Canis ferox
 †Canis latrans
 †Canis lepophagus
  Carya
 Castor
 †Castor californicus
 †Castor canadensis
 Ceanothus
 Cedrela
 Cercidiphyllum
 Cervus
 †Cervus elaphus – or unidentified comparable form
 †Chamaecyparis
 Chen
 †Chrysolepis
 Ciconia – tentative report
  †Ciconia maltha
 Comptonia
 Cornus
 †Cosoryx
 Craigia
 Crataegus
 †Cunninghamia
 Cygnus
 Cynomys
 †Dennstaedtia
  †Diceratherium
 †Dipoides
 Dolichoderus
 †Domnina
 †Dromomeryx
 Dytiscus
 Elaphe
 †Elaphe vulpina
 †Epicyon
 †Epicyon haydeni
 †Equisetum
 Equus
 †Equus idahoensis
 †Equus scotti
  †Equus simplicidens
 Erethizon
 †Erethizon dorsatum
 †Eucommia
 †Euptelea
 Falco
 †Falco peregrinus
 Felis
 †Fraxinus
 Gallinula
 †Gallinula chloropus
 †Garrya
 †Gigantocamelus
 Ginkgo
  †Ginkgo adiantoides
 †Gleditsia
 Halesia
 †Hemiauchenia
 †Hemiauchenia macrocephala
 Homo
 †Homo sapiens
  †Homotherium
 †Homotherium serum
 Hydrangea
  †Hypohippus
 †Hypolagus
 Ilex
 Juglans
 Larix
 Lasiurus
 Lasius
 †Ledum
 Lepus
 Libocedrus
  †Limnephilus
 †Liriodendron
 †Lithocarpus
 Lontra
 †Lontra canadensis
 Lynx
 †Lynx canadensis
 †Lynx rufus
 †Macrophya
 Mahonia
 †Mammut
  †Mammut americanum
 †Mammuthus
 †Mammuthus columbi
 †Megacamelus
 †Megalonyx
 †Megalonyx jeffersonii
  †Megalonyx leptostomus
  †Megantereon
 Meleagris
 †Meleagris gallopavo
 Mergus
 †Mergus merganser
 †Merychyus
 †Mesoreodon
 Messor – tentative report
 †Metalopex
 Metasequoia
 †Metasequoia occidentalis
 †Michenia
  †Miohippus
 Mustela
 Natrix
 Neophrontops
 Neotoma
 †Niglarodon
 †Nyssa
 Odocoileus
 Ondatra
 †Ondatra zibethicus
 †Osmunda
 Ostrya
  †Oxydactylus
 †Palaeolagus – tentative report
 Panthera
 †Panthera leo
  †Paramylodon
 †Paramylodon harlani
 †Parthenocissus
 Pelecanus
 †Pelecanus halieus – type locality for species
 Perognathus
 Peromyscus
 Persea
 Phalacrocorax
 †Phalacrocorax auritus
 Phenacomys
 Phryganea
  Picea
 Pinus
 Platanus
  †Platygonus
 Populus
 Porzana
 †Potamogeton
 †Procastoroides
 Procyon
 †Procyon lotor
  †Promerycochoerus
 †Protolabis
 Prunus
 †Pseudolarix
 †Pseudotsuga
 Pterocarya
 Puma
 †Puma concolor
 Quercus
 Querquedula
 Rangifer
 †Rangifer tarandus
 †Rhamnus
 Rhododendron
 Rhus
  †Rhynchotherium
 †Ribes
 Rosa
 Salix
 Sassafras
 †Satherium
 †Satherium piscinarium
 Scapanus
 †Scapanus townsendii – or unidentified related form
 Sciara
 Sequoia
 †Sequoia affinis
 †Sequoiadendron
 †Sequoiadendron chaneyi
  †Simocyon
 †Smilax
  †Smilodon
 †Smilodon fatalis
 †Sophora
 †Sorbus
 Sorex
 †Sorex palustris
 Spermophilus
 †Spiraea
  †Stegomastodon
 †Stegomastodon mirificus
 Sthenictis
 †Symphoricarpos
 Taxidea
 †Taxidea taxus
 Taxodium
  †Teleoceras
 Thamnophis
 Thomomys
 †Thomomys townsendii
 †Thuja
 †Ticholeptus
 Tilia
 †Trigonictis macrodon
 †Tsuga
 Typha
 Ulmus
 †Ungnadia
 Ursus
  †Vaccinium
 †Vauquelinia
 Vulpes
 †Vulpes vulpes
 Zelkova

References
 

Idaho